The 2004 LPGA Championship was the 50th LPGA Championship, played June 10–13 at DuPont Country Club in Wilmington, Delaware.

Defending champion Annika Sörenstam won the second of her three consecutive LPGA championships, three strokes ahead of runner-up Shi Hyun Ahn. Due to heavy rains on Friday, the final 36 holes were played on Sunday. It was the seventh of Sörenstam's ten major titles.

Beginning in 1994, the DuPont Country Club hosted this championship for eleven consecutive seasons, ending with this edition. The next five were played in nearby Maryland, at 
Bulle Rock Golf Course in Havre de Grace.

Past champions in the field

Made the cut

Source:

Missed the cut

Source:

Final leaderboard
Sunday, June 13, 2004

Source:

References

External links
Golf Observer leaderboard
DuPont Country Club

Women's PGA Championship
Golf in Delaware
LPGA Championship
LPGA Championship
LPGA Championship
LPGA Championship